Juan Miguel Padilla (born February 17, 1977) is a former  Major League Baseball  relief pitcher.

Amateur career
Despite being taught barely any English in high school, he enrolled at Tallahassee Community College to begin his college baseball career. He later transferred to Jacksonville.

Major league career
Padilla was a 24th round draft pick of the Minnesota Twins. Padilla had Tommy John surgery in March  and had to miss the 2006 season.

Padilla was not offered a new contract by the Mets and became a free agent on December 12, 2007. He was later signed to a minor-league contract and given a non-roster invitation to spring training by the Mets. In July , Padilla was released by the Mets.

Independent ball
Padilla signed with the York Revolution of the independent Atlantic League of Professional Baseball on July 26, 2008. Padilla did not return for the 2009 season. Padilla has also played for the Pittsfield Colonials in 2010.

He last played professionally in 2011 for the Bridgeport Bluefish and Leones de Yucatán.

References

External links

1977 births
Living people
Major League Baseball pitchers
Major League Baseball players from Puerto Rico
Cincinnati Reds players
Jacksonville Dolphins baseball players
New York Mets players
New York Yankees players
Rochester Red Wings players
Trenton Thunder players
Columbus Clippers players
Norfolk Tides players
New Orleans Zephyrs players
2006 World Baseball Classic players
York Revolution players
Bridgeport Bluefish players
Nashua Pride players
Pittsfield Colonials players
American Defenders of New Hampshire players
People from Río Piedras, Puerto Rico
Tallahassee Eagles baseball players